Rice allergy is a type of food allergy. People allergic to rice react to various rice proteins after they eat rice or breathe the steam from cooking rice. Although some reactions might lead to severe health problems, doctors can diagnose rice allergy with many methods and help allergic people to avoid reactions.

Symptoms and signs
Some rice proteins are regarded as the causes of allergy in people. People allergic to rice might experience sneezing, runny nose, itching, asthma, stomachache, hives, sores in the mouth, or eczema after they eat rice. Besides eating rice, people with a rice allergy can have reactions breathing rice steam from cooked rice. In severe cases, death may result.

Diagnosis 
People suspected of having a rice allergy can try diet avoidance on their own. First, they have to avoid rice for a couple of weeks. If they don’t have symptoms in the avoidance period but have those when exposed to rice, they are most likely allergic to rice.

Specific rice IgE, a kind of antibody in human blood, will rise significantly when people are allergic to rice. A blood test shows the level of the antibody.

Skin prick test, the most efficient diagnosis, shows the reactions in a short period. After being pricked in their skin with some rice mixture, allergic people will get itching and swelling in about 30 minutes.

Treatment 
Some symptoms might weaken if people get allergy shots. After getting several treatments for a long time, some allergic people will not have reactions afterwards.

Some reactions have been eased by replacing original rice with genetically modified rice. This is regarded as a new choice for rice allergic people.

Reactions might lessen by staying away from rice long-term.

Prevalence 
Unlike other food allergies, rice allergy is relatively uncommon. It has been reported worldwide but mostly in China, Japan or Korea. Because rice is a major food in Asia, people from Asia are exposed to higher allergy risk than people from other areas.

References 

Rice
Food allergies
Allergology